Barbara Davis Blum (born July 6, 1939) is an American businesswoman who served as the Deputy Administrator of the United States Environmental Protection Agency from 1977 to 1981.

References

1939 births
Living people
People of the United States Environmental Protection Agency
Washington, D.C., Democrats